Vilangkattuvalasu, or Vilangattuvalasu, is a small village in Erode District, Tamil Nadu, India. It is situated 4 km away from Sivagiri.

Villages in Erode district